Lucas Martín Vila (born 23 August 1986) is an Argentine former field hockey player who played as a forward.

He made his debut for the national squad in 2005, after having played the Junior World Cup in Rotterdam, Netherlands. He played a total of 274 times for the Argentina national team until 2023. His older brothers Matías and Rodrigo were also field hockey players for Argentina.

International career
At the 2012 Summer Olympics, Vila competed for Argentina in the men's tournament. Lucas won the bronze medal at the 2014 Men's Hockey World Cup and three medals at the Pan American Games. He was part of the Argentinian squad, which won the gold medal at the 2016 Summer Olympics. In 2018 he was selected for the 2018 World Cup which means he has played in four consecutive World Cups. He scored 1 goal in four matches in that tournament. In July 2019, he was selected in the Argentina squad for the 2019 Pan American Games. They won the gold medal by defeating Canada 5-2 in the final. In December 2019, he was nominated for the FIH Player of the Year Award. After the 2023 Men's FIH Hockey World Cup he retired from the national team.

Club career
Vila started his career in Argentina at Banco Provincia. In the 2005–06 season he played for Harvestehude in the German Bundesliga. In 2007 he moved to the Netherlands to play for TMHC Tilburg, which he left in 2010 to play for HGC. He missed a big part of his first season at HGC because of a knee injury. After two seasons with HGC he went to Belgium to play for Royal Orée before coming back to the Netherlands after one year to play for HC Den Bosch. After one season with Den Bosch he went to Spain to play for Club de Campo. He left the club from Madrid also after one season to play for Real Club de Polo. With Real Club de Polo, he played in the Euro Hockey League. In 2017 Vila transferred to his current club Mannheimer HC in Germany. After three seasons in Mannheim he made a move to Leuven. On 20 August 2021, it was announced he would leave Belgium to play for Spanish second division side Benalmádena.

Honours

Club
HGC
 Euro Hockey League: 2010–11
Real Club de Polo
 Copa del Rey: 2015–16, 2016–17

International
Argentina
 Summer Olympics: 2016
 Pan American Games: 2011, 2015, 2019
 Pan American Cup: 2013, 2017
 Champions Challenge: 2007
 South American Games: 2022
 South American Championship: 2013
Argentina U21
 Junior World Cup: 2005
 Pan American Junior Championship: 2005

Individual
 South American Championship leading goalscorer: 2013
 Junior World Cup Best player: 2005

References

External links

1986 births
Living people
Argentine male field hockey players
Olympic field hockey players of Argentina
Male field hockey forwards
Pan American Games gold medalists for Argentina
2006 Men's Hockey World Cup players
Field hockey players at the 2007 Pan American Games
2010 Men's Hockey World Cup players
Field hockey players at the 2011 Pan American Games
Field hockey players at the 2012 Summer Olympics
2014 Men's Hockey World Cup players
Field hockey players at the 2015 Pan American Games
Field hockey players at the 2016 Summer Olympics
2018 Men's Hockey World Cup players
Field hockey players at the 2019 Pan American Games
Field hockey players from Buenos Aires
Olympic gold medalists for Argentina
Olympic medalists in field hockey
Medalists at the 2016 Summer Olympics
Pan American Games silver medalists for Argentina
Pan American Games medalists in field hockey
HGC players
HC Den Bosch players
Club de Campo Villa de Madrid players
Real Club de Polo de Barcelona players
Hockey India League players
Mannheimer HC players
Harvestehuder THC players
Men's Belgian Hockey League players
Men's Hoofdklasse Hockey players
División de Honor de Hockey Hierba players
KHC Leuven players
Men's Feldhockey Bundesliga players
Medalists at the 2007 Pan American Games
Medalists at the 2011 Pan American Games
Medalists at the 2015 Pan American Games
Medalists at the 2019 Pan American Games
Field hockey players at the 2020 Summer Olympics
Competitors at the 2022 South American Games
South American Games gold medalists for Argentina
South American Games medalists in field hockey
2023 Men's FIH Hockey World Cup players
21st-century Argentine people